Delena is a genus of spiders.

Delena or DeLena may also refer to:

 Delena, Oregon, United States
 Delena cancerides, a huntsman spider
 DeLena Johnson (born 1963), American politician
 Delena Kidd (born 1935), English actress

See also 
 De Lena, a white Spanish wine grape variety
 Deleni (disambiguation)
 Deena, a given name
 Helena (disambiguation)
 Selena (disambiguation)

Feminine given names